The Heraclean Tablets (in older texts, the Heraclean Table(s); Lat.Tabulae Heracleenses) are bronze tablets found a short distance from the site of Heraclea Lucania, in the direction of Metapontum. They are significant for the study of Roman Law.

Background
As a consequence of its having accepted Roman citizenship in 89 BCE, Heraclea became a municipium, and the Tabulae Heracleenses contain a long Latin inscription relating to the municipal regulations of Heraclea, which is a part of a copy of a more general law, the Lex Iulia Municipalis, issued in 45 BCE for the regulation of the municipal institutions of towns throughout Italy. This document is a major authority for the municipal law of ancient Italy; it is engraved on two tablets of bronze, on the back of which is a long Greek inscription of earlier date, probably the 3rd century BC, defining the boundaries of lands belonging to various temples.

History of the tablets
The tablets were separate, and the major one was in two fragments. They were found in 1732, and 1735, in the bed of the Cavone river.

A fragment was purchased by Francesco Ficoroni and taken to England, where it was sold to Brian Fairfax the younger. On Fairfax's death in 1749, it was bought by Philip Carteret Webb. In the end it was returned to Naples in 1752. The tablets are now in the Naples National Archaeological Museum.

Scholarship
The Latin inscription was first published by Michel Maittaire in 1735. There have been legal commentaries by Heinrich Eduard Dirksen (Berlin, 1817–1820) and Friedrich Carl von Savigny, in his Vermischte Schriften vol. iii. Both inscriptions were published with commentaries, by Alessio Simmacho Mazzocchi (1684–1771) (2 vols. fol. Naples, 1754, 1755). The other inscription is in Doric Greek.

Notes

Further reading
 Henri Legras (1907), La table latine d'Héraclée: (la prétendue Lex julia municipalis); archive.org.
 Arianna Uguzzoni, Franco Ghinatti (1968), Le tavole greche di Eraclea.

External links
 Transcription of Latin text
Translation of Latin text
 Museo Archeologico Nazionale di Napoli, Lastra con decreto della colonia di Eraclea relativo alle proprietà del tempio di Dioniso, cd. tavole di Eraclea (2480)

Attribution

Greek inscriptions
Latin inscriptions
Roman law
Heraclea Lucania